Winegar (alternately spelled Wineker, Winnegar, Weniger, Wennecker or Wijngard) is a surname of Dutch or German origin. It may refer to:

People
Surname
Albert J. Winegar, American politician
Anna Lillian Winegar (1867-1941), American painter and illustrator
Charles E. Winegar, American soldier, member of the XII Corps during the Battle of Chancellorsville and the Battle of Gettysburg, member of the XX Corps during the Carolinas Campaign
Jessica Winegar, American author, 2007 winner of the Albert Hourani Book Award
Joe Winegar, American Texas Tech University alumnus, member of the Saddle Tramps, designer of Bangin' Bertha
Marvin Winegar, American baseball player, outfielder on the All-Tournament Team of the 1958 College World Series
Mr. Winegar, fictional American character in The Fortress of Solitude (novel)
Quentin Winegar, American seaman
Uldrick Winegar, 18th-century Swiss immigrant (first to Württemberg, where he married; then to the USA), one of the earliest settlers of Amenia, New York, grandfather-in-law of Thomas Young, subject of Historic Marker 8 in Dutchess County, New York
William S. Winegar, American lumber business magnate, one-time eponym of Presque Isle, Wisconsin
William W. Winegar, American soldier, American Civil War Medal of Honor recipient

Also:

List of Zion's Camp participants (Alvin Winegar, Samuel Winegar, and Samuel's daughter Almira were participants)

Given name
Albion Winegar Tourgée, American soldier, lawyer, judge, novelist, and diplomat

Places
United States
Hendrik Winegar House, Historic Landmark 112 in Dutchess County, New York
Winegar, a former name of Presque Isle, Wisconsin
Winegar Building, Historic Landmark 7 in Kit Carson County, Colorado
Winegar Hole Wilderness, a part of the Caribou-Targhee National Forest, Teton County, Wyoming
Winegar Lake, a lake in Scrivner Road Conservation Area, Cole County, Missouri
Winegars, Michigan

Other
"Down by the Winegar Works", a song published in 1925
Grand Chute v. Winegar at Law (in List of United States Supreme Court cases, volume 82)
Grand Chute v. Winegar in Equity (in List of United States Supreme Court cases, volume 82)
Winegar's Market, a supplier of Associated Food Stores

References

External links
FamilySearch: Uldrich WINEKER OR WINEGAR (AFN: 1R8X-09)
WinegarFam.com: Amenia New York in Duchess County - Early American Roots (includes photo of Historic Marker 8 in Dutchess County, New York)
Jim Winegar's Genealogy Blog

Dutch-language surnames
Lists of people by surname